In statistics, and specifically in the study of the Dirichlet distribution, a neutral vector of random variables is one that exhibits a particular type of statistical independence amongst its elements. In particular, when elements of the random vector must add up to certain sum, then an element in the vector is neutral with respect to the others if the distribution of the vector created by expressing the remaining elements as proportions of their total is independent of the element that was omitted.

Definition

Formally, consider the vector of random variables 

where

The values  are interpreted as lengths whose sum is unity. In a variety of contexts, it is often desirable to eliminate a proportion, say , and consider the distribution of the remaining intervals within the remaining length.

 

Variable  is neutral if  is independent of the remaining interval: that is,  being independent of 

In general, variable  is neutral if  is independent of

Complete neutrality

A vector for which each element is neutral is completely neutral.

If  is drawn from a Dirichlet distribution, then  is completely neutral. In 1980, James and Mosimann showed that the Dirichlet distribution is characterised by neutrality.

See also
 Generalized Dirichlet distribution

References

Theory of probability distributions
Independence (probability theory)